Vincenzo Garofalo (born 8 August 1999) is an Italian footballer who plays as a midfielder for  club Trento on loan from Brescia.

Career
On 3 October 2020, Garofalo joined Foggia.

On 1 July 2022, he joined Brescia. That was his first season in Serie B where he made three late substitute appearances. On 31 January 2023, Garofalo was loaned to Trento.

Club statistics

Notes

References

1999 births
People from Avellino
Sportspeople from the Province of Avellino
Footballers from Campania
Living people
Italian footballers
Association football midfielders
Spezia Calcio players
U.S. Salernitana 1919 players
Modena F.C. players
Pisa S.C. players
Potenza Calcio players
A.S. Pro Piacenza 1919 players
F.C. Rieti players
A.S. Sambenedettese players
U.S. Avellino 1912 players
Calcio Foggia 1920 players
Brescia Calcio players
A.C. Trento 1921 players
Serie B players
Serie C players
Serie D players